Kyrkjebø is a former municipality in the old Sogn og Fjordane county, Norway. The  municipality existed from 1858 until 1964 when it became part of the new municipality of Høyanger which still exists and is part of the new Vestland county.  Prior to its dissolution, the municipality of Kyrkjebø included land on the north and south side of the Sognefjorden.  The administrative centre of the municipality was the village of Kyrkjebø, where the main Kyrkjebø Church is located.

Name
The municipality was originally named after the old Klævold farm.  The first element comes from the Old Norse word kleppr meaning "hill" and the second element is identical to the Old Norse word vǫllr meaning "level ground".  Therefore, the meaning could be a hill in the middle of level ground.
  
The municipality was later named after the old Kirkebø farm, since Kyrkjebø Church was located there.  The first element of the name is identical with the name for "church", and the second element of the name is identical with the word for "farm".  It was named this because it was the farm where the church was located.  From 1890 until 1917 the name was spelled Kirkebø (using the Bokmål spelling) and then in 1917 it was changed to Kyrkjebø (using the Nynorsk spelling).

History
The parish of Klævold was established as a municipality in 1858 when it was separated from the municipality of Lavik. At the time of its creation, it had a population of 1,645.  On 1 January 1875, a border adjustment took place, moving part of Klævold with 90 inhabitants to the neighboring municipality of Lavik og Brekke. On 1 July 1890, the name was changed from Klævold to Kirkebø, and then in 1917 it was changed again to Kyrkjebø. During the 1960s, there were many municipal mergers across Norway due to the work of the Schei Committee. On 1 January 1964, the municipality of Kyrkjebø (population: 4,742) was merged with the neighboring municipality of Lavik (population: 894) and the unpopulated Nybø and Nygjerdet part of Vik Municipality to become a part of the newly created municipality of Høyanger.

Government

Municipal council
The municipal council  of Kyrkjebø was made up of 29 representatives that were elected to four year terms.  The party breakdown of the final municipal council was as follows:

Notable residents
Ivar Jacobsen Norevik (1900–1956) — politician
Odd Vattekar (1918–1992) — politician

See also
List of former municipalities of Norway

References

External links

Weather information for Kyrkjebø 

Høyanger
Former municipalities of Norway
1858 establishments in Norway
1964 disestablishments in Norway